Sahofika Hydroelectric Power Station, also referred to as Sahofika Power Station, is a  hydroelectric power station under construction in Madagascar.

Location

Overview
The power station is the largest electricity generation project in Madagascar. The power house comprises seven turbines, each rated at 29.3 megawatts, for a total output of 205 megawatts. The power generated at this power plant will be evacuated via a new 220 kiloVolts high voltage transmission line to a location where Jirama, the national electricity utility, will integrate it into the national electricity grid. A 25-year power purchase agreement has been signed, between NEHO and Jirama.

This power station is expected to supply power to an estimated 8 million people and help Madagascar avoid the emission of 900,000 tonnes of carbon dioxide every year.

Developers, ownership and funding 
The project is a public private partnership (PPP), between (a) the Government of Madagascar and (b) a consortium called Nouvelle énergie hydroélectrique de l’Onive (NEHO) or
New Onive Hydroelectric Energy Consortium, comprising the French companies Eiffage and Eranove and the company Themis. The government of Madagascar will contribute €30 million towards the development of this power station.

The African Development Bank, through the African Development Fund, lent €4.02 million to the government Madagascar towards this project. In addition, the Arab Bank for Economic Development in Africa (BADEA) and the European Union, are expected to provide further funding for this project.

Cost and construction
The total cost for the power station is US$895 million (approx. €836 million). The NEHO consortium was selected to carry out the feasibility studies, provide financing, construct the power station, operate the station when completed and maintain it in future. The government of Madagascar will contribute €30 million towards the project and will be a shareholder in the power station when completed. Construction began in December 2019 and commissioning of the completed project is expected in 2024.

Associated infrastructure
It is expected that the power station will come online in 2024.

See also

 Africa Dams
 Madagascar Power Stations
 Volobe Hydroelectric Power Station

References

External links
AfDB to provide $100m guarantee for 205MW Sahofika hydropower project in Madagascar As of 19 December 2019.

Hydroelectric power stations in Madagascar
Buildings and structures in Madagascar
Dams under construction